Tracie McAra (born 20 November 1960) is a Canadian basketball player. She competed in the women's tournament at the 1984 Summer Olympics.

Awards and honors
Top 100 U Sports women's basketball Players of the Century (1920-2020).

References

External links
 

1960 births
Living people
Basketball people from British Columbia
Canadian women's basketball players
Olympic basketball players of Canada
Basketball players at the 1984 Summer Olympics
Sportspeople from Victoria, British Columbia